Fressnapf Tiernahrungs GmbH is a German franchise company for pet food. With over 1400 stores and 8000 employees in 12 European countries it is the largest European pet product retailer.

History 
At 24 years of age, Torsten Toeller founded his first store for pet food and pet supplies in Erkelenz, Germany. Inspired by similar American pet superstores, he adapted the concept for the European market. From 1992 on, franchise stores were developed. In 1997, the first stores outside Germany were founded. Since then, the company has been awarded several prizes in Germany, ranking the franchise system among Burger King and McDonald's.

Franchises 
Today, Fressnapf has stores in eleven European countries. The highest number of stores is in Germany (777), followed by Austria (90) and Netherlands (52). The company is also present in Switzerland, Belgium, France, Hungary, Denmark, Poland, Luxembourg and Ireland, and Italy.
In many non-German speaking countries, the chain is called Maxi Zoo, with the exception of  Fressnapf in Hungary. Jumper in the Netherlands no longer has a partnership with Fressnapf. Fressnapf used to have stores in Italy under the MaxiZoo brand but in 2022 they fused their MaxiZoo italian branch (MaxiZoo S.p.a.) into their competitor Arcaplanet, who was bought by the Cinven investment fund earlier. The merging left Arcaplanet as the only surviving brand, with Fressnapf being a minority shareholder of the Arcaplanet chain, while Cinven holds the majority of shares. So Fressnapf, while not having any store in Italy holding their own brand's name (MaxiZoo) anymore, is now (partially) an owner of the italian Arcaplanet brand and partner of Cinven.

References

External links 
 fressnapf.com

Franchises
Retail companies established in 1990
Retail companies of Germany
Companies based in North Rhine-Westphalia
Krefeld